Ciaramella is an Italian surname. Notable people with the surname include:

 Alberto Ciaramella (born 1947), Italian computer engineer and scientist
 Massimo Ciaramella (born 1970), Italian baseball player

See also
 Caramella (disambiguation), includes a list of people with surname Caramella

Italian-language surnames